Shor (Translation: Noise) is a 1972 Indian Hindi movie written, produced and directed by Manoj Kumar, who also plays the lead role in the film. The film was remade in Tamil as Osai.

Plot
Shankar (Manoj Kumar) loses his wife (Nanda) in an accident. She dies while saving her son (Deepak). Due to the accident, Deepak loses his voice. Shankar is keen to hear his son's voice again; however, doctors suggest that Deepak has to undergo a surgery to get his voice back. Shankar tries hard to collect money for the surgery and finally is able to collect enough money for the surgery after a few hardships. Deepak undergoes the surgery successfully. Shankar is keen to meet Deepak; however, the doctor advises to him to meet Deepak the next day so as to not overexert the patient. Shankar goes to work; however, is unable to focus properly while working with machines and eventually gets injured. The injury causes him to lose his hearing. The father is now unable to hear his son's voice when he regains it.

Cast
 Manoj Kumar as Shankar
 Jaya Bhaduri as Raat Ki Rani / Rani - Shankar's well wisher & in love with Shankar
 Prem Nath as Khan Badshah - Rani's father
 Nanda as Geeta - Shankar's wife (special appearance)
 Kamini Kaushal as Shankar's mom  
 Madan Puri as Factory Owner
 Asrani as Shantilal
 Master Satyajeet as Deepak - Shankar & Geeta's Son
 Manorama as Victoria - Shanta's mom
 Meena T. as Shanta
 Shefali
 Leena
 Manmohan as Kabrastan Ke Raja
 Raj Mehra as Doctor
 Nana Palsikar
 Krishan Dhawan
 Kuljeet
 V. Gopal as Mr. Moradabadi

Soundtrack
The popular music of this movie is composed by the duo Laxmikant Pyarelal, is most noted for the memorable song "Ek Pyar Ka Nagma" (एक प्यार का नग्मा है, मौजो की रवानी है). The song was penned by Santosh Anand.

Awards

 20th Filmfare Awards:

Won

 Best Editing – Manoj Kumar

Nominated

 Best Director – Manoj Kumar
 Best Supporting Actor – Prem Nath
 Best Music Director – Laxmikant–Pyarelal
 Best Lyricist – Santosh Anand for "Ek Pyaar Ka Nagma Hai"
 Best Male Playback Singer – Mukesh for "Ek Pyaar Ka Nagma Hai"
 'Best Story – Manoj Kumar

References

External links
 
 https://www.thehindu.com/features/cinema/shor-1972/article5196454.ece

1972 films
1970s Hindi-language films
Films scored by Laxmikant–Pyarelal
Hindi films remade in other languages
Films directed by Manoj Kumar